Stonecircle is an acoustic Celtic fusion band, formed in 1993 in Salt Lake City, Utah by George Schoemaker (12-string guitar, harmonica, vocals). Current members of the band are Krista Baker (fiddle, violin), Nina Cooley (flute, percussion, background vocals), Brian Dobson (uilleann pipes, Irish whistle, bodhran) and Mary Johnston-Coursey (vocals, whistles, percussion).  The stated goal of the band is "to create a musical experience that is both ethereal and beautifully uplifting".

The Celtic fusion sound mixes traditional tunes from England, Scotland, Ireland and Brittany with original vocal and instrumental songs in the Celtic style.  Schoemaker writes many of the original lyrics, drawing from Greek mythology, Celtic folk tales, and historical episodes from France and the British Isles.

Stonecircle has played at Kingsbury Hall, the Downtown Olympic Festival during the 2002 Olympic Winter Games, and at numerous other venues throughout the Intermountain West.

Discography
Serendipity (1997)
Alchemy (2001)
In Concert (2003)
Winter Sky (2005)
Asterisk & Dragonflies: 1997-2007 (2007)
Metamorphosis (2009)

External links
Official website

American folk rock groups
Celtic music groups
Musical groups from Utah
Musical groups established in 1993
1993 establishments in Utah